Usman Khan Tarakai (born 1 September 1947) is a Pakistani politician who had been a member of the National Assembly of Pakistan from the constituency NA-19 (Swabi-II) from August 2018 till January 2023. Previously, he was a member of the National Assembly NA-12 ( Now changed to NA-19) from 2008 to May 2018.

Early life
He was born on 1 September 1947 in Swabi Pakistan.

He worked as a technical advisor for Al Jazeera in Qatar before entering politics.

Political career

Engr. Usman Tarakai was elected to the National Assembly of Pakistan as an independent candidate from Constituency NA-12 (Swabi-I) in 2008 Pakistani general election. He received 49,872 votes and defeated Asfandyar Wali Khan of Awami National Party.

Tarakai was re-elected to the National Assembly as a candidate of Awami Jamhuri Ittehad Pakistan from Constituency NA-12 (Swabi-I) in 2013 Pakistani general election. He received 56,680 votes and defeated a Haji Rahman Ullah of ANP.

In 2016, Awami Jamhuri Ittehad Pakistan merged into Pakistan Tehreek-e-Insaf (PTI).

He was re-elected to the National Assembly as a candidate of PTI from Constituency NA-19 (Swabi-II) in 2018 Pakistani general election. He received 83,903 votes and defeated Waris Khan, a joint candidate of ANP and other political parties.

References

Living people
Pashtun people
People from Swabi District
stubs
1947 births
Pakistani MNAs 2008–2013
Pakistani MNAs 2002–2007
Pakistani MNAs 2018–2023